Lilia Buckingham (born April 9, 2003) is an American Internet personality, actress, dancer, author, and producer.

Early life and education 
Buckingham was born and raised in Beverly Hills, to Jane (née Rinzler) and Marcus Buckingham. She has an older brother, Jack. She is openly bisexual.

Career
Buckingham began acting in local musical theatre productions at a young age. She competitively danced with the MNR Dance Factory, where she met and befriended Mackenzie and Maddie Ziegler and began to grow her online platform. Together with her older brother, Jack, they co-founded anti-cyberbullying organization Positively Social.

Buckingham made her television debut in 2012 with a minor role in an episode of Modern Family. She began working with Brat in 2018, starring as Autumn Miller on the web series Dirt. The character has also made appearances in other series such as Chicken Girls, Total Eclipse and Zoe Valentine, as well as the 2019 Brat film Spring Breakaway. She also made several appearances on the network's talk show, Brat Chat.

In November 2018, Buckingham and Emily Skinner released a single, "Denim Jacket", and donated a portion of the proceeds to GLAAD.

Buckingham voices Heather Masterson, the epistolary narrator of Brat series Crown Lake, which she co-produces with Sara Shepard. Her other filmmaking work includes directing and producing a music video for Jillian Shea Spaeder's 2019 single "Something Better", which received accolades at a number of film festivals. She and Spaeder, her then-girlfriend, wrote and starred in the short film Pink.

Buckingham and Shepard went on to co-author a young adult novel, Influence, about the world of social media influencers.

In 2022, Buckingham starred in Meet Cute's series, A Pool For Love. The story is set at a public pool in Florida where Buckingham's character, Jordan, is the new head lifeguard. Marissa, the new girl on the block, joins the lifeguard team and turns Jordan's summer into chaos as she starts to explore her own sexuality and grow feelings for Marissa.

Bibliography
 Influence (2021) , co-written with Sara Shepard

Filmography

Film and television

Web

Music videos

References

External links 

 
 

Living people
2003 births
21st-century American actresses
Actresses from California
American child actresses
American Internet celebrities
American people of English descent
American web producers
American web series actresses
Bisexual actresses
Entertainers from California
LGBT people from California
People from Beverly Hills, California
American bisexual actors